McGhee Tyson Airport  is a public/military airport 12 miles south of Knoxville, in Alcoa, Blount County, Tennessee, United States. It is named for United States Navy pilot Charles McGhee Tyson, who was killed in World War I.

Owned by the Metropolitan Knoxville Airport Authority, it is served by several major airlines and employs about 2,700 people. It is a 30-minute drive to the Great Smoky Mountains National Park. The airport is the home of McGhee Tyson Air National Guard Base, an air base for the 134th Air Refueling Wing (134 ARW) of the Tennessee Air National Guard.

History
On August 1, 1930, the original McGhee Tyson airport opened, named for Charles McGhee Tyson. It as built on 60 acres in West Knoxville where West High School is now located. In 1935, the city purchased 351 acres in Blount County for the current airport. On July 29, 1937, an American Airlines Stinson Trimotor (about 10 seats) touched down, the first airline flight; before that, American's Stinsons landed at Island Airport on Dickinson Island east of town. The 1938 directory shows a 3100-ft N-S runway and a 4200-ft NE-SW runway at McGhee Tyson; the 1939 directory shows 4000 ft N-S and 5000 ft NE-SW. The city built a control tower in 1941.

The development of TYS helped the City of Alcoa diversify its economy and gain its economic independence from what is today Arconic Inc. (formerly Alcoa Inc.), the world's third largest producer of aluminum. Alcoa Inc. built one of its production plants in Alcoa because of the proximity of dams along the Little Tennessee River which were a hydroelectric energy source for the production of aluminum.

In 1951, the United States Air Force built several facilities on the field and  runway 5L. The Federal Aviation Administration (FAA) added an Instrument Landing System to runways 5L and 23R in 1959. The first scheduled airline jets were Delta DC-9s in December 1965.

In 1968, McGhee Tyson built a new air cargo facility; a new passenger terminal opened in 1974, a few years after runway 18/36 closed. Four years later, the Metropolitan Knoxville Airport Authority (MKAA) was established. In 1990, runway 5R/23L was rebuilt to 9,000 feet. In 1992, the airport authority built a new 21-acre cargo facility on the north side of the airport for Federal Express, UPS and Airborne Express. Buildings were designed to meet the carriers' needs; 90% of the air cargo operations are UPS and Federal Express. Cost of the project was estimated at $9.3 million.

In 2000, improvements to the passenger terminal were finished at a cost of $70 million, including two new concourses, 12 new gates, ticket counters, and a Ruby Tuesday restaurant. In 2002 an aircraft maintenance facility was built for Northwest Airlines, serving as their primary CRJ MRO facility. The now-defunct ExpressJet Airlines built a heavy-maintenance hangar near the air cargo facilities for its fleet. In June 2009, a new food court was completed, featuring Starbucks, Quiznos, Cinnabon, and Zia locations. The Zia location was replaced in April 2013 with an Uno Express Pizza.

In November 2016, the agency that operates McGhee Tyson received a $27.9 million grant from the Federal Aviation Administration to complete the next phase of a multi-year runway expansion, the most expensive project the airport ever has undertaken. The north runway, 5L/23R, is being lengthened to 10,000 feet. During the work, 3,000 feet of that runway were demolished while 6,000 feet remained open for small planes. Airliners still land on Runway 5R/23L, which will remain 9,000 feet long. 

On December 17, 2021 the rebuilt 10,000 foot runway 5L/23R reopened.

Facilities
McGhee Tyson Airport covers 2,250 acres (911 ha) at an elevation of 979 feet (298 m). It has two parallel runways: 5L/23R is 10,000 by 150 feet (3,048 x 46 m) concrete and 5R/23L is 9,000 by 150 feet (2,743 x 46 m) asphalt.

The fixed-base operator (FBO) at TYS is Signature Aviation, the parent company of Signature Flight Support. In July of 2022 Signature Aviation announced the acquisition of the TAC Air division of TAC (The Arnold Companies) and the FBO was rebranded to join the Signature network. 

Originally, Tac Air first moved into TYS on April 1, 2005, when it purchased Knox-Air, which had operated in TYS since 1974. Then a month later, on May 5, 2005, TAC Air purchased the only remaining FBO, Cherokee Aviation, which had been in operation since 1954. TAC Air combined these two FBOs under their own name, and they were the sole supplier of aviation fuel for commercial, corporate and general aviation aircraft as well as leased hangar space at the airport.

In 2017, the airport had 106,584 aircraft operations, averaging 292 per day: 43,598 general aviation, 21,450 air taxi, 20,271 military, and 21,265 airline. In 2017, 168 aircraft were based at the airport: 62 single-engine, 32 multi-engine, 35 military, 38 jet and 1 helicopter.

TYS is home to a maintenance base for Endeavor Air, crew base for Allegiant Air, and delivery, maintenance and training centers for Cirrus Aircraft.

Terminal
McGhee Tyson Airport has two levels. The top level is accessed via the curbside drop off and the parking garage. The top level has ticket counters, security, gates, restaurants and shops. It is designed with a Smoky Mountain theme, complete with faux waterfalls and wood carvings of bears. The bottom level is used for car rental counters, three baggage claims, airline offices, and airport offices.
There are 12 gates. On a regular day Gates 2 & 4 are used by Allegiant Air, Gate 6 is a common use gate, Gates 8, 10, & 12 are used by American, Gates 1, 3 & 5 are used by Delta, and Gates 7, 9, & 11 are used by United. Gate assignments can be subject to change.

Airlines and destinations

Passenger

Cargo

Statistics

Top destinations

Airline Market Share

Accidents and incidents
 On March 12, 1992, a USAir Express Jetstream 31 crashed on landing after the pilot failed to lower the landing gear. There were no passengers aboard, but the two crew members were killed.

References

External links

 
 134th Air Refueling Wing
 
 

Airports in Tennessee
Buildings and structures in Blount County, Tennessee
Transportation in Knoxville, Tennessee
Transportation in Blount County, Tennessee
Alcoa, Tennessee
Airports established in 1930
1930 establishments in Tennessee